Ignacy Koschembahr-Łyskowski (1864–1945) was a Polish jurist and scholar of civil law.

After studies in Berlin and a habilitation in Breslau, Koschembahr-Łyskowski taught Roman law at the universities of Fribourg, Lemberg and Warsaw from 1895 to 1930.

Koschembahr-Łyskowski was a member and, since 1927, the vice president of the legislative committee that sought to reunify the law of the re-established Polish republic. He created a draft of the general provisions of a Polish civil code.

References

Polish legal scholars
Academic staff of the University of Warsaw
Academic staff of the University of Lviv
Academic staff of the University of Fribourg
1864 births
1945 deaths